Darageh (also known as Dezkeh) is a village in Chamzey Rural District, in the Central District of Malekshahi County, Ilam Province, Iran. At the 2006 census, its population was 47, in 9 families. The village is populated by Kurds.

References 

Populated places in Malekshahi County
Kurdish settlements in Ilam Province